The tentacled dragonet (Anaora tentaculata) is a species of dragonet native to tropical reefs in the western Pacific Ocean.

Description
The Tentacled dragonet reaches a maximum length of  TL.  The fish has 4 dorsal spines, 8 dorsal soft rays, no anal spines, 7 anal soft rays. It is commonly identified by "moderately long tentacle behind the eye and numerous small leafy appendages on the body".

Distribution and habitat
The tentacled dragonet also inhabits sheltered algae reef lagoons, usually in on near seagrass beds. It is distributed in the Western Pacific: Moluccas, Philippines, Ryukyu Islands, Palau, Yap, and Guam.

References

External links
 

Callionymidae
Monotypic fish genera
Fish described in 1835
Taxa named by John Edward Gray